Sir Francis William Lowe, 1st Baronet (8 January 1852 – 12 November 1929) was a British Conservative Party politician.

He was elected as the Member of Parliament for Edgbaston at a by-election in February 1898, and held the seat until he stood down at the 1929 general election, when he was succeeded by future UK Prime Minister Neville Chamberlain who had moved from Birmingham Ladywood.

He was made a Baronet in 1918, of Edgbaston in the City of Birmingham, and was appointed as Privy Councillor in the 1929 Dissolution Honours.

He was married to Mary Holden; they had four children, including his heir Francis Gordon, who was a well-known tennis player before the First World War, as was another son, Arthur. A third son, John, played first-class cricket.

References

External links 

1852 births
1929 deaths
Lowe, Sir Francis, 1st Baront
Conservative Party (UK) MPs for English constituencies
UK MPs 1895–1900
UK MPs 1900–1906
UK MPs 1906–1910
UK MPs 1910
UK MPs 1910–1918
UK MPs 1918–1922
UK MPs 1922–1923
UK MPs 1923–1924
UK MPs 1924–1929
Members of the Privy Council of the United Kingdom
People from Birmingham, West Midlands